Peter, Paul and Mary is the debut studio album by American folk trio Peter, Paul and Mary, released in May 1962 on Warner Bros. Records. Released in both mono and stereo on catalog no. 1449, it is one of the rare folk albums to reach No. 1 in the US—staying for over a month. The lead-off singles "If I Had a Hammer" and "Lemon Tree" reached numbers 10 and 35 respectively on the Billboard Pop Singles chart. It was the group's biggest selling studio album, eventually certified Double Platinum by the Recording Industry Association of America for U.S. sales of more than two million copies. The cover was photographed at The Bitter End in New York City.

The album was reissued as 180 Gram vinyl in 2016 under the Waxtime Label as #772125. The Waxtime issue has three Bonus tracks: which are side 1 #7 - "One Kind of Favor" (Live), side 2 track #7 - "The Times They Are A' Changin'" (Live) and track #8 - "If I Had My Way" (Live).

At the Grammy Awards of 1963, their recording of "If I Had a Hammer" won the Best Folk Recording and Best Performance by a Vocal Group Grammies.

Track listing
All tracks are traditional American folk songs arranged by Noel Paul Stookey and Peter Yarrow, except where noted.

Chart positions

Personnel
Milton Okun – musical director
Milton Glaser – cover design
Albert Grossman – producer
Bill Schwartau – recording engineer
Bernard Cole – cover photography at The Bitter End, New York City

References

Peter, Paul and Mary albums
1962 debut albums
Warner Records albums
Albums with cover art by Milton Glaser
Albums produced by Albert Grossman